Mythimna congrua is a species of moth of the family Noctuidae.

Etymology
The species name congrua, meaning congruous, refers to the similarity of these moths with other species.

Distribution
This species is widespread in southern Europe,   Algeria, Turkey, Israel, Syria, the Caucasian and Transcaucasian region, Azerbaijan, Iraq and Turkmenistan.

Habitat
These moths frequently occur in damp environments (marshes floodplain, etc.)  and in humid grassy areas.

Description
The moth has a wingspan of 31-36mm. These moths have rather broad forewings, with a yellowish-ocher ground color and clearer veins spread across the surface. A larger clearer vein divides the median area. Hindwings are mainly greyish with several veins and a dark gray dusting. The caterpillars are yellowish, with white and ocher longitudinal lines and small black spots along the body. This species is rather similar to Mythimna riparia.

Biology
Adults are on wing from January to April. There is possibly one generation in Israel, with adults on wing from January to May. In Europe there are two generations from March to June and from August to October.   The larvae hibernate. They feed on various Poaceae species  and probably also on  Cyperaceae).

Bibliography
Hubner, J. [1800-1838]: Sammlung europäischer Schmetterlinge 4: pl. 1-185.
O. Karsholt, J. Razowski (eds.), 1996. The Lepidoptera of Europe: a distributional checklist
SwissLepTeam (2010): Die Schmetterlinge (Lepidoptera) der Schweiz: Eine kommentierte, systematisch-faunistische Liste.  Fauna Helvetica 25. Neuchâtel (CSCF & SEG) 160, Nr. 10019

References

External links
Lepiforum.de
 Paolo Mazzei, Daniel Morel, Raniero Panfili Moths and Butterflies of Europe and North Africa

Mythimna (moth)
Moths of Europe
Moths of Africa
Moths of Asia
Moths of the Middle East
Taxa named by Jacob Hübner